Harford Lutheran School was a private secondary school located in Bel Air, Maryland, United States.

The school was operated by the Baltimore Lutheran High School Association, an association of Lutheran churches in the Baltimore area.  The Association opened its first campus, Baltimore Lutheran School, in suburban Towson in 1965.  Movement to Harford County and growth of the Towson campus moved the Association to open a second campus in 2002.

Harford Lutheran School had students from grades 6 through 12. Harford Lutheran closed in June 2009, with only one graduating class.

Defunct schools in Maryland
Lutheranism in Maryland
Defunct Lutheran schools
Defunct Christian schools in the United States
2002 establishments in Maryland
2009 disestablishments in Maryland
Educational institutions established in 2002
Educational institutions disestablished in 2009